Donato Mancini is a Canadian poet. He is most noted for his 2017 collection Same Diff, which was a shortlisted Griffin Poetry Prize finalist in 2018.

He has also been a two-time ReLit Award nominee for his poetry collections Ligatures in 2006 and Æthel in 2008.

Originally from Burlington, Ontario, he is a graduate of the University of British Columbia.

Books

 Ligatures, Vancouver: New Star Books, 2005
 Æthel, Vancouver: New Star Books, 2007
 Buffet World, Vancouver: New Star Books, 2011
 Loitersack, Vancouver: New Star Books, 2014
 Snowline, Buffalo/Toronto: eth Press, 2015
 Same Diff, Vancouver: Talonbooks, 2017

References

21st-century Canadian poets
21st-century Canadian non-fiction writers
Canadian male poets
Canadian literary critics
People from Burlington, Ontario
University of British Columbia alumni
Writers from Ontario
Living people
Canadian people of Italian descent
Canadian male non-fiction writers
Year of birth missing (living people)